Urge to Kill is a studio album by Brainbombs, issued on CD by Load Records in 1999. In 2010, Load Records issued the album for the first time on vinyl LP. The album's lyrical contents deal mainly deal with themes of sadism, murder and rape told from the perpetrator's perspective.

Track listing
"Slayer" – 3:37
"Slutmaster" – 5:36
"Salome" – 3:00
"Ass Fucking Murder" – 3:28
"Maybe" – 3:52
"Down in the Gutter" – 3:50
"Stupid and Weak" – 4:41
"Driving Through Leeds" – 4:38
"Filthy Fuck" – 4:00

References

Brainbombs albums
1999 albums